Dadanovka is a rural locality (a village) in Meselinsky Selsoviet, Aurgazinsky District, Bashkortostan, Russia. The population was 67 as of 2010. There is 1 street.

Geography 
Dadanovka is located 32 km south of Tolbazy (the district's administrative centre) by road. Sosnovka is the nearest rural locality.

References 

Rural localities in Aurgazinsky District